This is a list of notable Dayak people.

Notable Dayaks

Indonesia
Tjilik Riwut – National Hero of Indonesia and the first Governor of Central Kalimantan
Oevaang Oeray – Third Governor of West Kalimantan
Cornelis M.H. – The Eighth Governor of West Kalimantan
 Yurnalis Ngayoh - Vice Governor and 10th Governor of East Kalimantan.
Olla Ramlan - Indonesian TV personality
Alue Dohong - First Dayak Deputy Minister of Indonesia

Malaysia
Kanang anak Langkau – National hero of Malaysia
Stephen Kalong Ningkan – the first Chief Minister of Sarawak
Tawi Sli – the second Chief Minister of Sarawak
Jugah Barieng – Malaysian politician and former minister
Pandelela Rinong – Malaysian national diving athlete
Henry Golding – Malaysian-born Hollywood actor
Francisca Luhong James – Miss Universe Malaysia 2020 representatives.

References

Dayak people
Ethnic groups in Indonesia
Ethnic groups in Sarawak
Kalimantan
Headhunting
Indigenous peoples of Southeast Asia